Eğerce is a village in the Mudanya district of Bursa Province in Turkey.

The village was present during Ottoman Period and archival evidence suggest that the village is more than 420 years old. In the 17th Century the village was a Christian village and the name of it was "Eğerciler" which meant "saddle-makers" in Turkish. The village was providing sheep to the capital in the beginning of the 17th Century.

References

Villages in Mudanya District